Myriophyllum heterophyllum (English: twoleaf watermilfoil or broadleaf watermilfoil) is a species from the genus Myriophyllum. It was first described by André Michaux.

Description  
Myriophyllum heterophyllum is also known in English as either the twoleaf watermilfoil or broadleaf watermilfoil. It is a popular plant to in Aquariums or Garden-ponds.   The species is often misidentified or overlooked due to issues in predictions of infestations and dispersal. It is often mistaken as the M. verticillatum in Europe or the M. hippuroides, M. laxum or M. pinnatum in North America due to their similar vegetation.

Range 
Myriophyllum heterophyllum is endemic to the eastern part of the United States. In the European Union the plant has found in Austria, Belgium, Germany, Spain, France, Hungary and the Netherlands. Citizen science observations also suggests occurrences in the western-part of the United States and Central America.

Invasive species 
In the European Union the species naturalised in the wild and poses a thread to the biodiversity. It grows rapidly and can form dense maths just underneath the water surface causing reduced availability of Oxygen and sunlight. The European Union considers the risk of the species spreading high within the EU. As a preventative measure, Myriophyllum heterophyllum is included since 2017 in the list of Invasive Alien Species of Union concern (the Union list). This implies a ban of the import, trade, sale and transport of the species within the EU.

References

heterophyllum